William F. Opitz was a member of the Wisconsin State Assembly.

Biography
A German emigrant, Opitz was born in 1816. He moved to what is now Mequon, Wisconsin in 1839. Opitz died at his home in Grafton (town), Wisconsin on June 16, 1882. He was brother-in-law of Adolphus Zimmermann.

Career
Opitz was elected to the Assembly in 1860. Other positions he held include Chairman (similar to Mayor) of Grafton, as well as Sheriff and a member of the County Board of Ozaukee County, Wisconsin. He was a Democrat.

References

People from Mequon, Wisconsin
Democratic Party members of the Wisconsin State Assembly
Mayors of places in Wisconsin
Wisconsin sheriffs
1816 births
1882 deaths
People from Grafton, Wisconsin
19th-century American politicians